Tsukinami (月並み monthly, therefore "mediocre") may refer to:

Tsukinami, mediocre writers of the 19th century Haiku, after the monthly haikai gatherings
Tsukinami shiai (月次試合 monthly tournaments) in Judo, Kyushin Ryu
Tsukinami (album)